USS Kensington may refer to:

 , was a wooden, sail-rigged vessel purchased by the US Navy for the Stone Fleet
 , was a steamer purchased by the US  Navy 27 January 1862 and sold 12 July 1865

United States Navy ship names